Kuzhener (Kužeŋer) is an urban locality (an urban-type settlement) and the administrative center of Kuzhenersky District of the Mari El Republic, Russia. As of the 2010 Census, its population was 5,384.

Administrative and municipal status
Within the framework of administrative divisions, Kuzhener serves as the administrative center of Kuzhenersky District. As an administrative division, the urban-type settlement of Kuzhener, together with three rural localities, is incorporated within Kuzhenersky District as Kuzhener Urban-Type Settlement (an administrative division of the district). As a municipal division, Kuzhener Urban-Type Settlement is incorporated within Kuzhenersky Municipal District as Kuzhener Urban Settlement.

References

Notes

Sources

Urban-type settlements in the Mari El Republic
